Erpolzheim is an Ortsgemeinde – a municipality belonging to a Verbandsgemeinde, a kind of collective municipality – in the Bad Dürkheim district in Rhineland-Palatinate, Germany.

Geography

Location 
The municipality lies in the Palatinate on the German Wine Route. Erpolzheim belongs to the Verbandsgemeinde of Freinsheim, whose seat is in the like-named town.

History 
In 781, the municipality had its first documentary mention as Erbholfesheim.

Politics

Municipal council 
The council is made up of 16 council members, who were elected at the municipal election held on 7 June 2009, and the honorary mayor as chairman.

The municipal election held on 7 June 2009 yielded the following results:

Coat of arms 
The German blazon reads: 

The municipality’s arms might in English heraldic language be described thus: Per pale azure issuant from the line of partition an eagle displayed argent armed and langued gules, and argent a bunch of grapes slipped proper reversed.

The village’s oldest known seal from the 16th century bears the eagle as a charge, the device also borne by the Counts of Leiningen, who held the local lordship. Late in that same century, the grapes were added to stand for winegrowing. Some later seals, however, showed another plant with three leaves. The current arms are based on seals from the 16th and 17th centuries. They have been borne since 17 July 1952.

Culture and sightseeing

Regular events 
Each year in May, a culinary walking tour is held for fruit, asparagus and wine with 16 sampling stops offering homemade treats amidst the blossoming fruit groves and vineyards.

Along the 6.5 km walking circuit one finds, besides asparagus dishes, also other specialities and Erpolzheim wines.

Each year on the second-last weekend in August, the Weinkerwe (wine fair) is held.

At the Erpolzheimer Martinsmarkt (market) in November, artists display their works in the open courtyards.

Economy and infrastructure

Wine 
In Erpolzheim, the following wineries and wine estates can be found:
 Weingut Hubach
 Winzerhof Horst Koch
 Weingut Kohl
 Weingut Herbert Koob & Sohn
 Winzerhof Ruth Mayer
 Weingut Veddeler

Transport 
Erpolzheim lies on the single-track Neustadt an der Weinstrasse - Bad Dürkheim - Freinsheim – Grünstadt railway line and it has a stop with a lovely railway station building, although it is not used as such, but rather as a house. In the village centre up by the church is a bus stop served by buses on the Busverkehr Rhein-Neckar (BRN) route 453.

Notable people

Sons and daughters of the town 
 Georg Ludwig von Maurer (1790–1872), jurist, legal historian and politician.

References

External links 

Municipality’s official webpage 
Erpolzheim on the German Wine Route 

Bad Dürkheim (district)